The Royal Netherlands Navy Mine Service (Dutch: Mijnendienst) is a department within the Royal Netherlands Navy that is responsible for keeping Dutch coastal waterways and approaches to major seaport areas mine-free. It was established out of the Royal Netherlands Navy Torpedo Service in 1907.

History
The Royal Netherlands Navy Mine Service was established in 1907 when the first Dutch naval mine, Type 1907, was taken into service. The decision to introduce the naval mine was made a year earlier in 1906 and was likely influenced by the important role that mines had played during the Russo-Japanese War in 1904. The first minelayers and minesweepers that were used by the mine service consisted of ships that had been modified to be able to lay or sweep mines.

World War I
During the First World War the minelayers of the mine service laid several defensive minefields to defend the neutrality of the Netherlands. The idea behind the minefields was that it would make it harder for foreign naval ships to enter Dutch territorial waters. Besides laying minefields the ships and personnel of the mine service were also involved in disabling drifting and stranded mines. The important role of the mine service during this period led to a increase of new material. As a result the mine service had at the end of the First World War 17 minelayers in service.

Notes

Citations

References

 

Royal Netherlands Navy
Military units and formations established in 1907
1907 establishments in the Netherlands